The 2020 Australian Open described in detail, in the form of day-by-day summaries.

All dates are AEDT (UTC+11)

Day 1 (20 January)
 Seeds out:
 Men's Singles:  Denis Shapovalov [13],  Borna Ćorić [25]
 Women's Singles:  Sloane Stephens [24],  Barbora Strýcová [32]
 Schedule of Play

Day 2 (21 January)
 Seeds out:
 Men's Singles:  Félix Auger-Aliassime [20],  Jo-Wilfried Tsonga [28]
 Women's Singles:  Johanna Konta [12],  Markéta Vondroušová [15],  Amanda Anisimova [21],  Anastasija Sevastova [31]
 Schedule of Play

Day 3 (22 January)
 Seeds out:
 Men's Singles:  Matteo Berrettini [8],  Grigor Dimitrov [18],  Benoît Paire [21],  Dan Evans [30],  Hubert Hurkacz [31]
 Women's Singles:  Aryna Sabalenka [11],  Petra Martić [13],  Dayana Yastremska [23]
 Men's Doubles:  Kevin Krawietz /  Andreas Mies [3]
 Women's Doubles:  Nicole Melichar /  Xu Yifan [5],  Lyudmyla Kichenok /  Yang Zhaoxuan [14]
 Schedule of Play

Day 4 (23 January)
 Seeds out:
 Men's Singles:  Nikoloz Basilashvili [26]
 Women's Singles:  Karolína Muchová [20],  Danielle Collins [26]
 Schedule of Play

Day 5 (24 January)
 Seeds out:
 Men's Singles:  Stefanos Tsitsipas [6],  Roberto Bautista Agut [9],  Guido Pella [22],  Dušan Lajović [24]
 Women's Singles:  Naomi Osaka [3],  Serena Williams [8],  Madison Keys [10],  Ekaterina Alexandrova [25],  Elena Rybakina [29]
 Men's Doubles:  Pierre-Hugues Herbert /  Nicolas Mahut [1],  Jean-Julien Rojer /  Horia Tecău [8],  Raven Klaasen /  Oliver Marach [9],  Jürgen Melzer /  Édouard Roger-Vasselin [12]
 Women's Doubles:  Duan Yingying /  Zheng Saisai [9],  Lucie Hradecká /  Andreja Klepač [11],  Ellen Perez /  Samantha Stosur [12]
 Schedule of Play

Day 6 (25 January)
 Seeds out:
 Men's Singles:  David Goffin [11],  Karen Khachanov [16],  John Isner [19],  Pablo Carreño Busta [27],  Taylor Fritz [29]
 Women's Singles:  Karolína Plíšková [2],  Elina Svitolina [5],  Belinda Bencic [6],  Donna Vekić [19]
 Men's Doubles:  Łukasz Kubot /  Marcelo Melo [2],  Wesley Koolhof /  Nikola Mektić [5],  Jamie Murray /  Neal Skupski [14],  Máximo González /  Fabrice Martin [15]
 Women's Doubles:  Květa Peschke /  Demi Schuurs [8]
 Schedule of Play

Day 7 (26 January)
 Seeds out:
 Men's Singles:  Fabio Fognini [12],  Diego Schwartzman [14]
 Women's Singles:  Alison Riske [18],  Maria Sakkari [22],  Wang Qiang [27]
 Men's Doubles:  John Peers /  Michael Venus [7],  Mate Pavić /  Bruno Soares [10]
 Mixed Doubles:  Barbora Strýcová /  Marcelo Melo [1]
 Schedule of Play

Day 8 (27 January)
 Seeds out:
 Men's Singles:  Daniil Medvedev [4],  Gaël Monfils [10],  Andrey Rublev [17],  Nick Kyrgios [23]
 Women's Singles:  Kiki Bertens [9],  Elise Mertens [16],  Angelique Kerber [17]
 Men's Doubles:  Marcel Granollers /  Horacio Zeballos [6],  Bob Bryan /  Mike Bryan [13],  Austin Krajicek /  Franko Škugor [16]
 Women's Doubles:  Shuko Aoyama /  Ena Shibahara [10],  Veronika Kudermetova /  Alison Riske [13],  Viktória Kužmová /  Aliaksandra Sasnovich [15],  Sofia Kenin /  Bethanie Mattek-Sands [16]
 Mixed Doubles:  Chan Hao-ching /  Michael Venus [4],  Samantha Stosur /  Jean-Julien Rojer [7],  Hsieh Su-wei /  Neal Skupski [8]
 Schedule of Play

Day 9 (28 January)
 Seeds out:
 Men's Singles:  Milos Raonic [32]
 Women's Singles:  Petra Kvitová [7]
 Women's Doubles:  Elise Mertens /  Aryna Sabalenka [3],  Gabriela Dabrowski /  Jeļena Ostapenko [6]
 Schedule of Play

Day 10 (29 January)
 Seeds out:
 Men's Singles:  Rafael Nadal [1],  Stan Wawrinka [15]
 Women's Singles:  Anett Kontaveit [28],  Anastasia Pavlyuchenkova [30]
 Women's Doubles:  Barbora Krejčíková /  Kateřina Siniaková [4],  Chan Hao-ching /  Latisha Chan [7]
 Schedule of Play

Day 11 (30 January)
 Seeds out:
 Men's Singles:  Roger Federer [3]
 Women's Singles:  Ashleigh Barty [1],  Simona Halep [4]
 Men's Doubles:  Ivan Dodig /  Filip Polášek [4]
 Mixed Doubles:  Latisha Chan /  Ivan Dodig [6]
 Schedule of Play

Day 12 (31 January)
 Seeds out:
 Men's Singles:  Alexander Zverev [7]	
 Women's Doubles:  Hsieh Su-wei /  Barbora Strýcová [1]
 Mixed Doubles:  Gabriela Dabrowski /  Henri Kontinen [3]
 Schedule of Play

Day 13 (1 February)
 Schedule of Play

Day 14 (2 February)
 Seeds out:
 Men's Singles:  Dominic Thiem [5]
 Schedule of Play

References

Day-by-day summaries
Australian Open (tennis) by year – Day-by-day summaries